Eddie Mustafa Muhammad (born Edward Dean Gregory; April 30, 1952) is a former professional boxer and the former WBA Light Heavyweight Champion of the World. He is currently a boxing trainer. He has also been an occasional actor.

Amateur career 
Boxing under his birth name, Eddie Gregory, Muhammad won two New York Golden Gloves Championships.  Gregory won both the 1971 and the 1972 New York Golden Gloves 147 lb Open Championships. Gregory defeated future middleweight champion Vito Antuofermo in the 1971 finals and in 1972 defeated Patrick Maloney of the Leatherpushers Athletic Club to win the Championship. Gregory trained at the Police Athletic Leagues Howard Houses in Brooklyn, New York.

Professional career 
Known as "Flame", Muhammad turned pro in 1972 and in 1977 challenged WBA Light Heavyweight Title holder Víctor Galíndez but lost a unanimous decision.  He got a second shot at the title against Marvin Johnson in 1980, and won via an 11th-round TKO to take the belt.  He defended the belt twice in 1980 and lost a non-title bout against Renaldo Snipes in 1981.  Later in 1981 he would lose his title as well in a defense against Michael Spinks via unanimous decision.  
After losing the belt, Muhammad fought mainly club level fighters before landing another shot at a title in 1985, the vacant IBF Light Heavyweight Title, pitted against Slobodan Kacar.  Kacar won a narrow split decision and Muhammad retired after the bout.

Muhammad made a brief comeback in 1988, but hung up the gloves for good later that year after losing via TKO to journeyman Arthel Lawhorne.

He also appeared in two motion pictures: the 1980 film Raging Bull, playing the role of Billy Fox; and Leon Isaac Kennedy's 1981 version of Body and Soul, where he portrayed himself.

Film appearances
Raging Bull (1980) - Billy Fox - Fox Fight
Body and Soul (1981) - himself
Hope for the Broken Contender (2008) - Himself

Professional boxing record

|-
|align="center" colspan=8|50 Wins (39 knockouts, 11 decisions), 8 Losses (1 knockout, 7 decisions), 1 Draw 
|-
| align="center" style="border-style: none none solid solid; background: #e3e3e3"|Result
| align="center" style="border-style: none none solid solid; background: #e3e3e3"|Record
| align="center" style="border-style: none none solid solid; background: #e3e3e3"|Opponent
| align="center" style="border-style: none none solid solid; background: #e3e3e3"|Type
| align="center" style="border-style: none none solid solid; background: #e3e3e3"|Round
| align="center" style="border-style: none none solid solid; background: #e3e3e3"|Date
| align="center" style="border-style: none none solid solid; background: #e3e3e3"|Location
| align="center" style="border-style: none none solid solid; background: #e3e3e3"|Notes
|-align=center
|Loss
|
|align=left| Arthel Lawhorne
|TKO
|3
|21/10/1988
|align=left| Newark, New Jersey, U.S.
|align=left|
|-
|Win
|
|align=left| Melvin Epps
|UD
|10
|24/03/1988
|align=left| Newark, New Jersey, U.S.
|align=left|
|-
|Win
|
|align=left|"Rob" Roy Davidson
|TKO
|7
|04/02/1988
|align=left| Newark, New Jersey, U.S.
|align=left|
|-
|Loss
|
|align=left| Slobodan Kacar
|SD
|15
|21/12/1985
|align=left| Pesaro, Marche, Italy
|align=left|
|-
|Win
|
|align=left| Elvis Parks
|KO
|1
|22/08/1985
|align=left| Detroit, Michigan, U.S.
|align=left|
|-
|Win
|
|align=left| Ricky Parkey
|UD
|10
|18/06/1985
|align=left| Atlantic City, New Jersey, U.S.
|align=left|
|-
|Win
|
|align=left| Rick Myers
|TKO
|4
|03/04/1985
|align=left| Galveston, Texas, U.S.
|align=left|
|-
|Win
|
|align=left| Oscar Holman
|TKO
|7
|21/03/1985
|align=left| Detroit, Michigan, U.S.
|align=left|
|-
|Win
|
|align=left| Tyrone Booze
|UD
|10
|08/02/1985
|align=left| New York City, U.S.
|align=left|
|-
|Win
|
|align=left| Andy "Cap" Russell
|KO
|1
|29/06/1984
|align=left| Grayon, Cayman Islands
|align=left|
|-
|Win
|
|align=left| Jerry Celestine
|UD
|10
|22/01/1983
|align=left| Stateline, Nevada, U.S.
|align=left|
|-
|Win
|
|align=left| Lottie Mwale
|KO
|4
|02/10/1982
|align=left| Las Vegas, Nevada, U.S.
|align=left|
|-
|Win
|
|align=left| Pablo Paul Ramos
|UD
|10
|07/08/1982
|align=left| Philadelphia, Pennsylvania, U.S.
|align=left|
|-
|Win
|
|align=left| Michael Hardin
|TKO
|8
|11/12/1981
|align=left| Nassau, Bahamas
|align=left|
|-
|Loss
|
|align=left| Michael Spinks
|UD
|15
|18/07/1981
|align=left| Las Vegas, Nevada, U.S.
|align=left|
|-
|Loss
|
|align=left| Renaldo Snipes
|SD
|10
|17/05/1981
|align=left| Atlantic City, New Jersey, U.S.
|align=left|
|-
|Win
|
|align=left| Rudy Koopmans
|RTD
|3
|28/11/1980
|align=left| Los Angeles, California, U.S.
|align=left|
|-
|Win
|
|align=left| Jerry Martin
|TKO
|10
|20/07/1980
|align=left| McAfee, New Jersey, U.S.
|align=left|
|-
|Win
|
|align=left| Marvin Johnson
|TKO
|11
|31/03/1980
|align=left| Knoxville, Tennessee, U.S.
|align=left|
|-
|Win
|
|align=left| Kid Samson
|KO
|4
|28/11/1979
|align=left| Hauppauge, New York, U.S.
|align=left|
|-
|Win
|
|align=left| Johnny Wilburn
|KO
|1
|31/08/1979
|align=left| Shirley, New York, U.S.
|align=left|
|-
|Win
|
|align=left| Fred "Flintstone" Brown
|TKO
|3
|16/07/1979
|align=left| New York City, U.S.
|align=left|
|-
|Win
|
|align=left| Dave Lee Royster
|KO
|5
|10/07/1979
|align=left| Atlantic City, New Jersey, U.S.
|align=left|
|-
|Win
|
|align=left| Pat Cuillo
|UD
|10
|26/02/1979
|align=left| New York City, U.S.
|align=left|
|-
|Win
|
|align=left| David Conteh
|TKO
|8
|26/01/1979
|align=left| New York City, U.S.
|align=left|
|-
|Loss
|
|align=left| James "Great" Scott
|UD
|12
|12/10/1978
|align=left| Woodbridge, New Jersey, U.S.
|align=left|
|-
|Win
|
|align=left| James "Mason" Dixon
|KO
|1
|06/09/1978
|align=left| White Plains, New York, U.S.
|align=left|
|-
|Win
|
|align=left| Chuck Warfield
|KO
|1
|16/08/1978
|align=left| Newark, New Jersey, U.S.
|align=left|
|-
|Win
|
|align=left| Ed "Savage" Turner
|KO
|4
|14/06/1978
|align=left| White Plains, New York, U.S.
|align=left|
|-
|Win
|
|align=left| Ray "Fast Eddy" Elson
|TKO
|2
|02/06/1978
|align=left| Jersey City, New Jersey, U.S.
|align=left|
|-
|Win
|
|align=left| Nat Gates
|KO
|7
|14/04/1978
|align=left| Fort Lauderdale, Florida, U.S.
|align=left|
|-
|Win
|
|align=left| Ba Sounkalo
|PTS
|10
|22/03/1978
|align=left| Bamako, Mali
|align=left|
|-
|Win
|
|align=left| Jesse Burnett
|TKO
|10
|15/02/1978
|align=left| Las Vegas, Nevada, U.S.
|align=left|
|-
|Loss
|
|align=left| Victor Galindez
|UD
|15
|20/11/1977
|align=left| Turin, Piedmont, Italy
|align=left|
|-
|Win
|
|align=left| "Fast" Eddie Phillips
|TKO
|4
|16/09/1977
|align=left| Wilmington, Delaware, U.S.
|align=left|
|-
|Win
|
|align=left| Matthew Saad Muhammad
|SD
|10
|11/03/1977
|align=left| Philadelphia, Pennsylvania, U.S.
|align=left|
|-
|Win
|
|align=left| Johnny Wilburn
|KO
|3
|18/01/1977
|align=left| Sunnyside, Queens, New York, U.S.
|align=left|
|-
|Win
|
|align=left| Frank Davila
|KO
|2
|29/10/1976
|align=left| Sunnyside, Queens, New York, U.S.
|align=left|
|-
|Win
|
|align=left| Jimmy "Sugar Demon" Owens
|TKO
|10
|01/10/1976
|align=left| Sunnyside, Queens, New York, U.S.
|align=left|
|-
|Win
|
|align=left| Lee Barber
|KO
|4
|14/07/1976
|align=left| Philadelphia, Pennsylvania, U.S.
|align=left|
|-
|Win
|
|align=left| Otis Gordon
|KO
|4
|28/06/1976
|align=left| Sunnyside, Queens, New York, U.S.
|align=left|
|-
|Win
|
|align=left| DC Walker
|TKO
|6
|29/04/1976
|align=left| Kingston, New York, U.S.
|align=left|
|-
|Win
|
|align=left| Hildo Silva
|KO
|7
|08/03/1976
|align=left| New York City, U.S.
|align=left|
|-
|Loss
|
|align=left| Bennie Briscoe
|UD
|10
|18/08/1975
|align=left| Philadelphia, Pennsylvania, U.S.
|align=left|
|-
|Win
|
|align=left| Lenny Harden
|TKO
|10
|16/06/1975
|align=left| Philadelphia, Pennsylvania, U.S.
|align=left|
|-
|Win
|
|align=left| Don Cobbs
|KO
|6
|28/04/1975
|align=left| Philadelphia, Pennsylvania, U.S.
|align=left|
|-
|Win
|
|align=left| Steven "Flasher" Smith
|KO
|4
|14/01/1975
|align=left| Philadelphia, Pennsylvania, U.S.
|align=left|
|-
|Win
|
|align=left| Mario Rosa
|KO
|8
|25/11/1974
|align=left| New York City, U.S.
|align=left|
|-
|Win
|
|align=left| Eugene "Cyclone" Hart
|KO
|4
|26/08/1974
|align=left| New York City, U.S.
|align=left|
|-
|style="background: #B0C4DE"|Draw
|
|align=left| Nessim Max Cohen
|PTS
|10
|10/05/1974
|align=left| Marseille, Bouches-du-Rhone, France
|align=left|
|-
|Win
|
|align=left| Willie "Macho" Classen
|PTS
|8
|08/04/1974
|align=left| New York City, U.S.
|align=left|
|-
|Loss
|
|align=left| Radames Cabrera
|UD
|10
|03/12/1973
|align=left| New York City, U.S.
|align=left|
|-
|Win
|
|align=left| Elwood Townsend
|KO
|1
|24/09/1973
|align=left| Philadelphia, Pennsylvania, U.S.
|align=left|
|-
|Win
|
|align=left| Jose Anglada
|PTS
|8
|09/07/1973
|align=left| New York City, U.S.
|align=left|
|-
|Win
|
|align=left| Willie "The Flail" Wilson
|PTS
|6
|17/05/1973
|align=left| North Bergen, New Jersey, U.S.
|align=left|
|-
|Win
|
|align=left| Percy Halsey
|KO
|1
|01/02/1973
|align=left| North Bergen, New Jersey, U.S.
|align=left|
|-
|Win
|
|align=left| Pete Pagan
|KO
|3
|29/09/1972
|align=left| Sunnyside, Queens, New York, U.S.
|align=left|
|-
|Win
|
|align=left| Jose Pagan Rivera
|KO
|1
|16/09/1972
|align=left| Boston, Massachusetts, U.S.
|align=left|
|-
|Win
|
|align=left| Dave "Sugar" Wyatt
|KO
|4
|15/09/1972
|align=left| New York City, U.S.
|align=left|
|}

References

External links
 

1952 births
Living people
Sportspeople from Brooklyn
African-American boxers
Light-heavyweight boxers
World Boxing Association champions
Converts to Islam
African-American Muslims
American male boxers
Boxers from New York City
21st-century African-American people
20th-century African-American sportspeople